Jordan Trennie Bell (born January 7, 1995) is an American professional basketball player for the Guangzhou Loong Lions of the Chinese Basketball Association (CBA). He played college basketball for the Oregon Ducks. As a junior in 2017, Bell earned second-team all-conference honors in the Pac-12, when he was also named the conference's Defensive Player of the Year. He was drafted in the second round of the 2017 NBA draft by the Chicago Bulls. Bell won his first championship in his rookie season when the Warriors defeated the Cleveland Cavaliers in 2018.

High school career
Bell was born in Los Angeles, and attended Long Beach Polytechnic High School in Long Beach, California.

College career
Bell committed to the University of Oregon to play college basketball.

Bell redshirted in 2013. As a redshirt freshman at Oregon, Bell averaged 5.1 points, 6.1 rebounds and 2.7 blocks per game. His 94 blocks were a school record for a season. As a redshirt sophomore, he averaged 7.0 points, 5.4 rebounds and 1.8 blocks per game. As a redshirt junior, Bell averaged 10.9 points, 8.8 rebounds and 2.3 blocks per game and helped lead Oregon to the Final Four.

Professional career

Golden State Warriors (2017–2019)
On April 18, 2017, Bell declared for the 2017 NBA draft, and was picked with the 38th pick by the Chicago Bulls and later traded to the Golden State Warriors for $3.5 million in cash considerations.

Bell participated in the 2017 NBA Summer League.

On December 22, against the Los Angeles Lakers, Bell scored a career-high 20 points on 9-for-13 shooting to go with his career-high 10 rebounds in 25 minutes. On April 14, 2018, Bell made his debut in the NBA playoffs, coming off of the bench with three points and two rebounds in a 113–92 win over the San Antonio Spurs. The Warriors made it to the 2018 NBA Finals where they would sweep the Cleveland Cavaliers in four games.

Bell played in the 2018 NBA Summer League for the Warriors. On March 27, 2019, the Warriors suspended Bell for one game due to "conduct detrimental to the team". On May 16, 2019, Bell came off the bench and scored a playoff career high 11 points to go with 3 rebounds, 2 steals, and an assist and a block apiece in a 114–111 win against the Portland Trail Blazers. On May 20, Bell made his first career playoff start in a series clinching win against the Blazers, contributing 7 points, 2 assists, and a steal. The Warriors reached the 2019 NBA Finals, but were defeated in 6 games by the Toronto Raptors.

Minnesota Timberwolves (2019–2020)
On June 28, 2019, the Warriors extended Bell a qualifying offer, making him a restricted free agent. On July 11, Bell signed with the Minnesota Timberwolves.

Memphis Grizzlies (2020)
On February 5, 2020, Bell and Robert Covington were traded from the Timberwolves to the Houston Rockets in a four-team, 12-player deal. The next day, he was traded to the Memphis Grizzlies for Bruno Caboclo and a 2023 second-round pick swap. On March 2, 2020, Bell was waived by the Memphis Grizzlies.

On March 11, 2020, the Capital City Go-Go of the NBA G League announced that they had added Bell off of waivers, but Bell had yet to have his on-court debut for that team by the time that the 2019–20 season was suspended due to the COVID-19 pandemic. The G League season was later cancelled.

On June 29, 2020, the Cleveland Cavaliers announced that they had signed Bell to a two-year deal. On November 22, 2020, Bell, along with Alfonzo McKinnie, was traded to the Lakers in exchange for JaVale McGee; however, Bell was waived the following day.

Washington Wizards (2021)
On December 19, 2020, Bell signed with the Washington Wizards, but was waived the same day and subsequently added to the Erie BayHawks as a flex-affiliate player sent from the Capital City Go-Go on January 12, 2021.

However, before playing for Erie, Bell signed on January 23, 2021, a 10-day contract with the Wizards, but after three games, he was released on January 31.

Erie BayHawks (2021)
On February 2, 2021, The BayHawks re-added Bell to the Erie roster for the start of the G League season. He averaged 17.6 points, 9.3 rebounds and 3.3 assists per game in seven games for Erie.

Return to Washington (2021)
On April 14, 2021, Bell signed a second 10-day contract with the Wizards.

Return to Golden State (2021)
On May 13, 2021, Bell signed a two-way contract with the Golden State Warriors.

Santa Cruz Warriors (2021)
In August 2021, Bell joined the Atlanta Hawks for the 2021 NBA Summer League, scoring 6 points in 17 minutes on 3–4 shooting at his debut in a 85–83 loss against the Boston Celtics. On September 24, 2021, he re-signed with the Warriors, but was waived as one of the last cuts before the start of the regular season. In October 2021, Bell joined the Santa Cruz Warriors.

Chicago Bulls (2021–2022)
On December 30, 2021, Bell signed a 10-day contract with the Chicago Bulls, the team that originally drafted him, using the hardship exception that became available when the Bulls had multiple players in the NBA's health and safety protocols.

Return to Santa Cruz (2022)
On January 9, 2022, Bell was reacquired by the Santa Cruz Warriors.

Fort Wayne Mad Ants (2022)
On January 31, 2022, Bell was traded to the Fort Wayne Mad Ants.

Guangzhou Loong Lions (2022–present) 
On September 7, 2022, Bell was signed by the Guangzhou Loong Lions.

Career statistics

NBA

Regular season

|-
| style="text-align:left;"|
| style="text-align:left;  background:#afe6ba;"|Golden State†
| 57 || 13 || 14.2 || .627 || .000 || .682 ||3.6 || 1.8 || .6 || 1.0 || 4.6
|-
| style="text-align:left;"|
| style="text-align:left;"|Golden State
| 68 || 3 || 11.6 || .516 || .000 || .610 || 2.7 || 1.1 || .3 || .8 || 3.3
|-
| style="text-align:left;" rowspan="2"|
| style="text-align:left;"|Minnesota
| 27 || 0 || 8.7 || .533 || .222 || .568 || 2.9 || .5 || .1 || .4 || 3.1
|-
| style="text-align:left;"|Memphis
| 2 || 0 || 10.5 || .429 || .667 || 1.000 || 1.5 || 1.0 || .5 || .0 || 5.0
|-
| style="text-align:left;" rowspan="2"|
| style="text-align:left;"|Washington
| 5 || 1 || 13.4 || .350 || .000 || — || 3.8 || 1.0 || .6 || .6 || 2.8
|-
| style="text-align:left;"|Golden State
| 1 || 0 || 15.0 || .000 || — || .500 || 5.0 || 2.0 || .0 || 2.0 || 1.0
|-
| style="text-align:left;"|
| style="text-align:left;"|Chicago
| 1 || 0 || 2.0 || — || — || — || 1.0 || .0 || 1.0 || .0 || .0
|- class="sortbottom"
| style="text-align:center;" colspan="2"|Career
| 161 || 17 || 12.0 || .552 || .200 || .636 || 3.1 || 1.2 || .4 || .8 || 3.7

Playoffs

|-
| style="text-align:left;"|2018
| style="text-align:left; background:#afe6ba;"|Golden State†
| 17 || 0 || 10.2 || .531 || .000 || .500 || 2.8 || .9 || .4 || .5 || 2.4
|-
| style="text-align:left;"|2019
| style="text-align:left;"|Golden State
| 15 || 2 || 7.1 || .548 || .000 || .700 || 1.3 || .7 || .3 || .5 || 2.7
|- class="sortbottom"
| style="text-align:center;" colspan="2"|Career
| 32 || 2 || 8.7|| .540 || .000 || .583 || 2.1 || .8 || .3 || .5 || 2.6

College

|-
| style="text-align:left;"|2014–15
| style="text-align:left;"|Oregon
| 35 || 20 || 23.7 || .597 || – || .524 || 6.1 || 1.3 || .8 || 2.7 || 5.1
|-
| style="text-align:left;"|2015–16
| style="text-align:left;"|Oregon
| 31 || 4 || 20.5 || .576 || .000 || .519 || 5.3 || 1.2 || 1.1 || 1.7 || 6.8
|-
| style="text-align:left;"|2016–17
| style="text-align:left;"|Oregon
| 39 || 38 || 28.8 || .636 || .214 || .701 || 8.8 || 1.8 || 1.3 || 2.3 || 10.9
|- class="sortbottom"
| style="text-align:center;" colspan="2"|Career
| 105 || 62 || 24.7 || .610 || .188 || .630 || 6.8 || 1.5 || 1.1 || 2.2 || 7.8

References

External links

 Oregon Ducks bio
 Draft Express profile

1995 births
Living people
American men's basketball players
Basketball players from Long Beach, California
Basketball players from Los Angeles
Chicago Bulls draft picks
Chicago Bulls players
Erie BayHawks (2019–2021) players
Fort Wayne Mad Ants players
Golden State Warriors players
Memphis Grizzlies players
Minnesota Timberwolves players
Oregon Ducks men's basketball players
Power forwards (basketball)
Santa Cruz Warriors players
Washington Wizards players
United States men's national basketball team players
Long Beach Polytechnic High School alumni